Gertz  is a surname. Notable people with the surname include: 

Alejandro Gertz Manero (born 1939), Mexican politician and lawyer
Alison Gertz (1966–1992), AIDS activist
Bill Gertz, (born 1952), American editor, columnist and reporter for The Washington Times
Elmer Gertz (1906–2000), American lawyer, writer and civil rights activist
Irving Gertz (1915–2008), American composer
Jami Gertz (born 1965), American actress
Marc Gertz, American criminologist
Nurith Gertz (born 1940), Israel professor of Hebrew literature and film
Wanda Gertz (1896–1958), Polish army officer

See also
Gertz (department store)
Gertz v. Robert Welch, Inc.
Gertze